The Lake Naroch offensive in 1916 was an unsuccessful Russian offensive on the Eastern Front in World War I. It was launched at the request of Marshal Joseph Joffre and intended to relieve the German pressure on French forces. Due to lack of reconnaissance, Russian artillery support failed to overcome and neutralise the well-fortified German defenses and artillery positions, leading to costly and unproductive direct attacks, hindered by the weather. On 30 March General Evert ordered a halt to the offensive.

Background
Under the terms of the Chantilly Agreement of December 1915 Russia, France, Great Britain and Italy were committed to simultaneous attacks against the Central Powers in the summer of 1916. Russia felt the need to lend troops to fight in France and Salonika (against her own wishes), and to attack on the Eastern Front, in the hope of obtaining munitions from Britain and France.

The Lake Naroch offensive was launched at the request of France, in the hope that the Germans would transfer more units to the East after their attack on Verdun. 
Joseph Joffre had made the request directly to Mikhail Alexeyev.  According to Prit Buttar, "Alexeyev now convened a meeting on 24 February that included all three front commanders, where it was decided that, given the losses suffered by Ivanov's troops in January, any new attack would have to be made by one or both of the other fronts. After some discussion, the point chosen was the junction between the two fronts." The Northern Front, commanded by Alexei Kuropatkin, and West Front, commanded by Alexei Evert, had 266,000 and 643,000 infantry respectively, while the opposing Germans amounted to 495,000.

Comparison of strength
The Russian Northern Front was composed of the Twelfth Army, commanded by Vladimir Gorbatovsky, and the Fifth Army, commanded by Vasily Gurko.  The force devoted to the battle in the Russian West Front was composed of the First Army, commanded by Alexander Litvinov, and the Second Army, commanded by Vladimir Vasilyevich Smirnov.  However, before the battle commenced, Smirnov was replaced by Alexander Ragoza.

The Russian Second Army was made up of 16 infantry and 4 cavalry divisions, 253 battalions, 133 squadrons and had 887 artillery pieces, whereas the German forces numbered 9 infantry and 3 cavalry divisions, 89 battalions, 72 squadrons and 720 guns of various calibres.

On either side of Lake Naroch was the German Tenth Army, commanded by Hermann von Eichhorn. To the north was the Eighth Army, commanded by Otto von Below, and to the south was the Twelfth Army, commanded by Max von Fabeck.

Ragoza organized his army into three groups, with the northern group led by Mikhail Pleshkov, consisted of the I and XXVI Corps, with the I Siberian Corps. The central group, led by Leonid Sirelius, consisted of the XXXIV and IV Siberian Corps. The southern group, led by Pyotr Baluyev.

Battle
On the morning of 18 March, the Russian heavy artillery bombardment commenced in the northern and southern sectors.  However, the bombardment proved ineffective. Russian assault columns found the German defenses mostly intact, and suffered terrible flanking fire. The Russian Second Army suffered 15,000 casualties in that first day, with no gain. On the 19th, the Russian bombardment continued, but the Russian assault again faltered, resulting in an additional 5600 casualties.  On 21 March, the Russian assault continued with the I, XXVII and I Siberian Corps, and were able to capture the German front line. On 22 March the Russians were able to add somewhat to their modest gains. On 24 March, the Russian V Corps and III Siberian Corps attacked on the southern sector, but with little gain.  On 26 March, further attack by the Russian northern sector were also ineffective. On 29 March, Alexeyev ordered an end to the Russian assault.

Results
The whole operation turned out to be an utter failure, as it abated the Russians' morale without providing any help to the French, and has become a shining example of the use of a widely known World War I method of war, the human wave attack. Huge masses of people were continuously sent into the battle over and over again in the same place of the enemy front. Eventually, the attack on the German positions was brought to a halt because, as General Evert noted in his order issued on 30 March, it had not led to "decisive results" and "the onset of warm weather and abundant rains" had turned much of the area into swamps.

Literature
 Holstein, Günther. Nacht am Narocz [Night at Lake Narach] text set to music by Siegfried Wagner for tenor and piano in 1919.
 Keegan, J. (2001). Der erste Weltkrieg. Eine europäische Tragödie [The First World War. A European Tragedy]. (in German) Rowohlt-Taschenbuch-Verlag, Reinbek bei Hamburg, 
 Podorozhniy N. E. (1938). Narochskaya operatsiya v marte 1916 g. na russkom fronte mirovoy voyni [The Naroch Offensive in March 1916 on the Russian Front of the World War] (in Russian) Moscow: Voenizdat. 1938
 Stone, N. (1998). The Eastern Front 1914–1917. Penguin Books Ltd., London, 
 Zabecki, D. T., editor (2014). Germany at War: 400 Years of Military History. ABC-CLIO, 
 Zentner, C. (2000). Der erste Weltkrieg. Daten, Fakten, Kommentare. Moewig, Rastatt 2000,

References

External links 

The Battle of Lake Naroch, 1916

Conflicts in 1916
Lake Naroch
Lake Naroch
Lake Naroch
1916 in the Russian Empire
Military history of Belarus
March 1916 events